Gornji Striževac is a village in the municipality of Babušnica, Serbia. At the 2002 census, the village had a population of 154 people.

References

Populated places in Pirot District